Amnokgang Sports Club is a North Korean men's multi-sports club. Based in Pyongyang, the club competes in the DPR Korea Premier Football League.

History 
Affiliated with the Ministry of People's Security, it was founded on 19 September 1947.

The club is best known for its men's and women's football teams. The men's football team presently plays in the DPR Korea Premier League, and in various domestic cup competitions. They won several competitions in the 1960s, and won national titles in 2001, 2006, and 2008.

Rivalries
Amnokgang's primary rivals are April 25. April 25 belongs to the Ministry of People's Armed Forces, and the professional rivalry between the Military and Police carries over onto the sports field.

Current squad

Managers
 Ku Jong-nam (2013–2014)
 Han Won-chol (since 2014)

Achievements 
DPR Korea Football League: 8
 2001, 2006, 2008
 2002, 2010, 2011, 2014, 2016

Hwaebul Cup: 1
SF 2013

Man'gyŏngdae Prize: 4
 2007, 2008
 2013, 2014

Paektusan Prize: 2
 2012
 2007

Poch'ŏnbo Torch Prize: 2
 2016
 2005

Cup for the 60th Anniversary of the Victory in the Fatherland Liberation War: 1
 2013

Republican Championship: 3
 2007
 2009
 2011

Women's football
Amnokgang's women's football team won the national championship in 2004.

Other sports
In addition to football, the club has teams for ice hockey, basketball, volleyball, handball, and table tennis.

References 

 
Association football clubs established in 1947
1947 establishments in North Korea
Police association football clubs in North Korea
Football clubs in North Korea
Football clubs in Pyongyang
Multi-sport clubs in North Korea